Sociedade Esportiva Matsubara (S. E. Matsubara), usually known simply as Matsubara, was a Brazilian football club based in Cambará, in the state of Paraná.

History
It was founded on December 18, 1974 by the Japanese Brazilian Sueo Matsubara to replace the local club Cambaraense, runner-up of the 1953 Paranaense championship.

In 1976, Matsubara was Campeonato Paranaense runner-up.

In 1992, Matsubara finished in Campeonato Brasileiro Série C's third position. The club was eliminated in the Group B final (which is the stage immediately before the competition final) by Fluminense de Feira.

In 1995, the club transferred to Londrina, returning to Cambará soon after.

Titles

Domestic
Campeonato Paranaense
Runner-up (1): 1976
Torneio Integração de Futebol Profissional
Champions (1): 1989
Copa Santiago de Futebol Juvenil
Champions (1): 1991

International
Bình Dương Television Cup
Champions (2): 2007, 2011
Runners-up (1): 2010

Stadiums

Matsubara plays its home matches at Regional de Cambará, which has a maximum capacity of 15,000 people, and is owned by the Torcida Organizada Matsubara, which are an ultra group supporting the club.

The club also plays at Café Stadium, which has a maximum capacity of approximately 45,000 people and is located in Londrina city.

Matsubara owns a training ground called Vila Olímpica (Olympic Village).

Youth squad
The club has worked hard to train its younger members, and has produced many professional athletes. Players produced by the club are usually negotiated with Brazilian clubs, and clubs from other countries, like China, Germany, Italy, Japan, Mexico, Portugal, South Korea, Switzerland, United States of America, Uruguay and Vietnam.

Mascot
The club's mascot is called Japonesinho, which is the Portuguese for Little Japanese.

References
Much of the content of this article comes from the equivalent Japanese-language Wikipedia article (retrieved August 31, 2006).

External links
 Official website (Portuguese and English)

Association football clubs established in 1974
Matsubara
1974 establishments in Brazil